Daniel Ziblatt (born 1972)  is an American political scientist and a professor at Harvard University with a research focus on comparative politics, democracy and democratization as well as the politics and political history of Western Europe. Since 2018 he has been Eaton Professor of the Science of Government at Harvard University.  He is the author of the book Conservative Parties and the Birth of Democracy. In 2018, Ziblatt also published How Democracies Die with fellow Harvard professor Steven Levitsky. The book examines the conditions that can lead democracies to break down from within, rather than due to external events such as military coups or foreign invasions. How Democracies Die received widespread praise. It spent a number of weeks on The New York Times Best Seller list and six weeks on the non-fiction bestseller list of the German weekly Der Spiegel. The book was recognized as one of the best nonfiction books of 2018 by The Washington Post, Time, and Foreign Affairs.

Books

How Democracies Die, with Steven Levitsky, (Crown, 2018) – NDR Kultur Sachbuchpreis 2018; Goldsmith Book Prize 2019
Conservative Parties and the Birth of Democracy, (Cambridge: Cambridge University Press, 2017)
Structuring the State: The Formation of Italy and Germany and the Puzzle of Federalism, (Princeton: Princeton University Press, 2006)

References

External links
Daniel Ziblatt at Harvard University Retrieved 8 December 2019
 Retrieved 8 December 2019

Harvard University faculty
Living people
American political scientists
1972 births